Georgios Agorogiannis (born 3 May 1966) is a Greek former international football player who played as a right-back.

Club career
Agorogiannis started his football career at team of his hometown, Toxotis Larissa in 1982. Two years later his good performances won him a transfer to the greater club of the region, AEL. He established himself quickly in the club and was a key player in winning the Greek Cup in 1985 and the Greek Championship in 1988, which consist of the first major titles of the club. He stayed with "the crimsons" until the summer of 1992, when he transferred to the then champions, AEK Athens. He helped the "yellow-blacks" to win another 2 back-to-back league titles, while also participating in 2 Cup finals, losing both to Panathinaikos. He left AEK in 1995 and joined Panionios, where he stayed for a season before retiring from professional football.

International career
Agorogiannis was a member of the Greece U19 that qualified for the final stage of the European Championship in 1984, as well as the 1985 qualifying stage.

In 1987 he participated in two matches with the Olympic team, on 28 October in a friendly 0–2 loss at home against Italy and on 2 December against Poland, where they lost by 1–0 at home, for the Olympic Games of the 1988 in Seoul.

Agorogiannis played 7 games with Greece from 1989 to 1992. His debut took place on 5 September 1989 in an away friendly loss against Poland. He also played on 20 September 1989 in the loss against Yugoslavia away from home and on 11 October of the same year in the away defeat against Bulgaria. On 5 September 1990 he played in the win against Albania at home and on 10 October 1990 in the home win over Egypt. He also competed on 12 February 1992 in the victory against Romania at home and on 25 March in the away win against Cyprus, which was his last international appearance.

Honours

AEL
Alpha Ethniki: 1987–88
Greek Cup: 1984–85

AEK Athens
Alpha Ethniki: 1992–93, 1993–94

References

External links

1966 births
Living people
Greek footballers
Greece international footballers
Association football defenders
Athlitiki Enosi Larissa F.C. players
AEK Athens F.C. players
Panionios F.C. players
Super League Greece players
Footballers from Larissa